Stolen Moments was singer-songwriter John Hiatt's tenth album, released in 1990.  It was his highest charting solo album upon its release, peaking at No. 61.  Joan Baez later covered "Through Your Hands" on her 1992 album Play Me Backwards, and David Crosby covered it on his 1993 record Thousand Roads.  Don Henley's version reached No. 33 on the US Billboard charts and appeared in the film Michael.  The Nitty Gritty Dirt Band covered "The Rest of the Dream" on a 1990 album of the same title. Ilse DeLange recorded "Child of the Wild Blue Yonder" on her live album Dear John.

One song had actually been previously recorded by another artist several months before Hiatt's version was issued on this album. Earl Thomas Conley had a country hit with "Bring Back Your Love to Me"; it was issued as a single in February 1990 and reached No. 11 on both the US and Canadian country charts.

Track listing
All tracks written by John Hiatt

"Real Fine Love" – 4:21
"Seven Little Indians" – 4:08
"Child of the Wild Blue Yonder" – 4:26
"Back of My Mind" – 4:04
"Stolen Moments" – 4:12
"Bring Back Your Love to Me" – 4:04
"The Rest of the Dream" – 4:51
"Thirty Years of Tears" – 4:08
"Rock Back Billy" – 3:51
"Listening to Old Voices" – 5:30
"Through Your Hands" – 4:49
"One Kiss" – 4:22

Charts

Personnel
John Hiatt – guitar, piano, vocals
Pat Donaldson – bass guitar
Ethan Johns – drums, guitar, mandolin, choir, chorus
Mike Henderson – slide guitar, rhythm guitar
Ashley Cleveland – background vocals
Russ Taff – background vocals
Robert Russell Bennett – choir, chorus
Karen Peris – vocals on "Through Your Hands"
Michael Landau – electric guitar
Richie Hayward – drums, percussion
Paul Wickens – synthesizer
Bill Payne – piano on "Bring Back Your Love to Me"
Bobby King, Willie Greene Jr. – backing vocals on "Bring Back Your Love to Me"
Mac Gayden – slide guitar on "Thirty Years of Tears" and "Through Your Hands"
Michael Porter – drums on "Rock Back Billy"
David Kemper – drums on "Stolen Moments" and "Through Your Hands"
Chuck Leavell – organ on "Stolen Moments"
Technical
Robert Frank – cover photography

References

1990 albums
Stolen Moments
Albums produced by Glyn Johns
A&M Records albums